Farida Amrani (born 3 September 1976) is a Moroccan-born French trade unionist and politician from La France Insoumise. She has been a Member of Parliament since 2022.

Early life 
Born in Morocco in 1976, Amrani arrived in France at the age of 2.

Career 
After a Vocational Baccalauréat and a Transport and Logistics Services BTS, she became a territorial civil servant in 2003 at the Cœur d'Essonne.

She worked for the General Confederation of Labour.

In the 2014 French municipal elections, she ran for the Left Front list, obtaining 18.78% of the vote in the second round.

She challenged the former Prime Minister Manuel Valls in his seat at the 2017 legislative election, narrowly losing in the second round by 139 votes. She then mocked the candidacy of Manuel Valls in the 2019 Barcelona City Council election, and demanded his resignation from his mandate as a Member of Parliament. When Valls resigned from Parliament, she stood in the by-election but came in second place. She is the NUPES candidate in the Essonne's 1st constituency for the 2022 French legislative election. She came top in the first round. She was elected in the second round.

References 

1976 births
Living people
Moroccan emigrants to France
21st-century French women politicians
French women trade unionists
People from Essonne
Members of the General Confederation of Labour (France)
La France Insoumise politicians
Candidates for the 2017 French legislative election
Deputies of the 16th National Assembly of the French Fifth Republic
French people of Moroccan descent
Women members of the National Assembly (France)
Members of Parliament for Essonne